The West Virginia State Police (WVSP) is a state law enforcement agency in the United States that provides police services to the residents of West Virginia. It is the fourth-oldest state police agency in the US. The WVSP was disbanded due to their involvement in quelling of the uprisings on behalf of the coal and mine companies which were surrounding the concept of organized labor in the coal and mine industries. The WVSP was then reorganized as the Department of Public Safety in the second extraordinary session of the West Virginia Legislature on June 19, 1919, as a result of their involvement.

History

Governor John Jacob Cornwell was insistent upon having a State Police force which he said, "was mandatory in order for him to uphold the laws of our state." Part of the compromise was the name of the organization: "West Virginia Department of Public Safety" was the official name until 1995 when the name was changed to "West Virginia State Police" during the legislative session.

Today

Like other state law enforcement agencies, West Virginia troopers enforce traffic laws statewide, investigate crimes and protect the governor and his immediate family. The superintendent of the West Virginia State Police is Colonel Jan Cahill.

West Virginia State Police troopers wear a forest-green uniform and campaign hat. They receive their training at the West Virginia State Police Academy located in Institute, a suburb of Charleston, and near the agency's headquarters in South Charleston. Upon appointment, cadets undergo an intense training program at the State Police Academy.

The West Virginia State Police also runs its own forensic laboratory and provide scientific investigation services to law enforcement agencies across the state. Services offered to criminal justice agencies include biochemistry, drug, firearm investigations, latent prints, questioned documents, toxicology and trace evidence. The crime lab is accredited by the American Society of Crime Laboratory Directors/Laboratory Accreditation Board (ASCLD/LAB).

Recruitment and training

The West Virginia Division of Criminal Justice Services is responsible for setting minimum physical ability standards for police officers working in the state. In 2007, following a national trend, it relaxed the physical ability standards for aspiring police officers. Right now, any police applicant must do at least 27 push-ups/minute, 29 sit-ups/minute and be able to run  in a maximum time limit of 14 minutes 53 seconds. The State Police, however, chose not to follow those standards unlike most local police agencies in West Virginia. The agency's recruiters still require applicants to perform at least 27 push-ups/minute, 29 sit-ups/minute and those same applicants have to run  in no more than 14 minutes 52 seconds, which were all the initial minimum requirements for all police departments in West Virginia.

Training at the paramilitary academy lasts about 25 weeks compared to about 16 weeks for officers from other departments (trained at the same academy). When cadets graduate, they are promoted to the rank of "Trooper." They can be stationed anywhere in the 55 West Virginia counties working from detachments (barracks). They serve an eighteen-month probationary period that starts at the time they enter the academy. After completing successfully that probationary period, they are eligible to receive an associate degree in police sciences through the Marshall Technical and Community College program.

Personnel

The State Police has struggled with staffing issues for many years and the problem seems to persist mainly due to lack of funding to dramatically increase the number of road troopers. As of 2013, the agency employed well above 600 sworn officers, making it de facto the largest law enforcement agency in the state. The State Police is heavily relied upon to assist in many of the 55 West Virginia counties. In September 2013, news organizations started reporting a new initiative from the agency to increase manpower. The Accelerated Cadet Program targets local West Virginia police officers who want to join the State Police. Once hired, such officers would train for only 11 weeks instead of the 25 weeks normal cadets go through.

The State Police is and has been the only agency to operate a law enforcement academy in West Virginia. It trains its own troopers but also all other law enforcement officers from the state: sheriff deputies, city and college police officers, and motor carrier enforcement officers who, unlike in some states, are not part of the State Police but have their own separate agency.

Rank structure

Vehicles

State Police vehicles are composed of a variety of makes with blue and gold colors accompanied by the agency's logo on the side front doors. For many years, the agency has used Ford Crown Victorias for the road. In recent years however, State Police has phased in Chevy Impalas and the new Ford Police Interceptor and Police Interceptor Utility into its fleet. The agency also uses unmarked vehicles that are usually assigned to command staff members. Vehicles are mainly equipped with blue LED lights.

Weapons
Troopers are issued the .45 ACP Smith & Wesson 4566TSW, a version of the Smith & Wesson Model 4506. It has a bobbed hammer and blue metal finish. Each WVSP 4566TSW has the agency name and shoulder patch engraved. Each Trooper is issued an attachable flashlight which mounts to their pistol.

As of December 2018, Troopers are now using Glock 17 Gen 5 9mm handguns.

Organization
Cabinet Secretary
Superintendent of the State Police
Deputy Superintendent
Executive Services
Media Relations Unit
Personnel Unit
Medical Unit
Staff Services
Accounting Unit
Communications Unit
Criminal Records Unit
Forensic Laboratory
Planning and Research Unit
Procurement Unit
Promotional Standards Unit
Traffic Records Unit
Training Academy
Uniform Crime Reporting Unit
Professional Standards 
Legal Services
Field Operations
Field Troops 1 - 8
Bureau of Criminal Investigations 
Regional Offices 1 - 6
Investigative Support Services
Insurance Fraud Unit
Polygraph Unit
Drug Diversion Unit
Marijuana Eradication
Digital Forensics Unit
Technical Operations Unit
Cold Case Unit
Criminal Intelligence Unit
Special Operations Unit
Special Response Teams
Aviation Section
K‐9 Unit
Explosive Response Teams
Crimes Against Children Unit
Executive Protection Unit

Troops and detachments

Troop 0 Command - South Charleston
 Headquarters
 Forensic Laboratory
 Executive Protection
 Special Operations

Troop 1 Command - Fairmont
 Bridgeport Detachment
 Fairmont Detachment
 Grafton Detachment
 Kingwood Detachment
 Morgantown Detachment
 Moundsville Detachment
 New Cumberland Detachment
 New Martinsville Detachment
 Wellsburg Detachment
 West Union Detachment 
 Wheeling Detachment

Troop 2 Command - Charles Town
 Berkeley Springs Detachment
 Charles Town Detachment
 Keyser Detachment
 Martinsburg Detachment
 Moorefield Detachment
 Romney Detachment

Troop 3 Command - Elkins
 Buckhannon Detachment
 Elkins Detachment
 Franklin Detachment
 Glenville Detachment
 Marlinton Detachment
 Parsons Detachment
 Philippi Detachment
 Sutton Detachment
 Webster Springs Detachment
 Weston Detachment

Troop 4 Command - South Charleston
 Clay Detachment
 Grantsville Detachment
 Harrisville Detachment
 Parkersburg Detachment
 Quincy Detachment
 Ripley Detachment
 South Charleston Detachment
 Spencer Detachment
 Mason County Detachment
 Winfield Detachment
 St Marys Detachment

Troop 5 Command - Logan
 Hamlin Detachment
 Huntington Detachment
 Logan Detachment
 Madison Detachment
 Williamson Detachment 
 Wayne Detachment

Troop 6 Command - Beckley
 Beckley Detachment
 Gauley Bridge Detachment
 Hinton Detachment
 Jesse Detachment
 Lewisburg Detachment
 Oak Hill Detachment
 Princeton Detachment
 Rainelle Detachment
 Richwood Detachment
 Summersville Detachment
 Welch Detachment
 Whitesville Detachment
 Union Detachment

Troop 7 Parkways (WV Turnpike) Command - Beckley
 Parkways - Beckley Parkways Detachment
 Parkways - Charleston South Parkways Detachment
 Parkways - Princeton Parkways Detachment

Troop 8 Bureau of Criminal Investigation (BCI)

Fallen officers
Since the establishment of the West Virginia State Police, 41 officers have died while on duty.

See also

 List of law enforcement agencies in West Virginia
 West Virginia State Police Academy
 State Police (United States)
 State Patrol
 Highway Patrol

References

Additional references
 State Journal (in a May 2005 article)
 State Trooper: America's State Troopers and Highway Patrolmen (Turner Publishing Company)

External links
 West Virginia State Police website
 West Virginia State Police Association website

Government of West Virginia
State law enforcement agencies of West Virginia
Government agencies established in 1919
1919 establishments in West Virginia